The National University of General Sarmiento (UNGS) (Castilian: Universidad Nacional de General Sarmiento) is a national university in Argentina, founded in 1993. It is located in the localidad (small city) of Los Polvorines, of Malvinas Argentinas Partido, in the Greater Buenos Aires urban area.

Academics
UNGS is composed of four colleges (called institutos), offering seventeen courses.

The four colleges of UNGS are:

 Instituto de Ciencias (ICI)
 Instituto del Conurbano (ICO)
 Instituto del Desarrollo Humano (IDH)
 Instituto de Industria (IDEI)

Undergraduate programs
The university offers several undergraduate programs including History, Geography, Education, Philosophy, Communication, Political Sciences, Public Policy, Urbanism, Economics, Mathematics, Physics and Engineering.

Graduate programs
The graduate program such as Specializations, Master and PhD Programs.

Student life
Most students are from Buenos Aires, though there are also international students from other Latin American countries. Noted faculty include José Luis Coraggio, a published economist.

See also
Science and Education in Argentina
Argentine Higher Education Official Site 
 Argentine Universities

References

External links

 Official website 
 Official website 
 Publications
 Useful information for visitors

1993 establishments in Argentina
General Sarmiento
Education in Buenos Aires
Educational institutions established in 1993
Universities in Buenos Aires Province